In enzymology, an uracilylalanine synthase is an enzyme that catalyzes the chemical reaction

O3-acetyl-L-serine + uracil  3-(uracil-1-yl)-L-alanine + acetate

Thus, the two substrates of this enzyme are O3-acetyl-L-serine and uracil, whereas its two products are 3-(uracil-1-yl)-L-alanine and acetate.

This enzyme belongs to the family of transferases, specifically those transferring aryl or alkyl groups other than methyl groups.  The systematic name of this enzyme class is O3-acetyl-L-serine:uracil 1-(2-amino-2-carboxyethyl)transferase. Other names in common use include O3-acetyl-L-serine acetate-lyase (adding uracil), isowillardiine synthase, willardiine synthase, and 3-O-acetyl-L-serine:uracil 1-(2-amino-2-carboxyethyl)transferase.

References

 
 
 

EC 2.5.1
Enzymes of unknown structure